Mathias Kwame Ntow is a Ghanaian politician and member of the Seventh Parliament of the Fourth Republic of Ghana representing the Aowin Constituency in the Western Region on the ticket of the National Democratic Congress.

Personal life 
Elder Ntow is a Christian, a member of the Church of Pentecost. He is married to Mrs. Victoria Sam (with six children).

Early life 
Hon. Ntow was born in Nkwanta No. 2  on Monday, 11 November 1957. He attended the University of Winneba and had a Bachelor of Education Degree in Social Studies. He also had Teacher's Certificate A from the Enchi College of Education

Ntow graduated from University of Education Winneba with a Masters of Art in Human Rights in 2007.

Career 
Mr. Ntow is an Educationist by profession. He was also employed by GES (Principal Supt and Social Science Tutor, Enchi College of Education).

Politics 
Ntow is a member of the National Democratic Congress (NDC). In 2008, he contested for the Aowin seat on the ticket of the NDC for the fifth parliament of the fourth republic and won. He was the MP for Aowin Constituency, Western Region. He was also a member of parliament for the sixth and the seventh parliament of the fourth Republic of Ghana.

References

Ghanaian MPs 2017–2021
1957 births
Living people
National Democratic Congress (Ghana) politicians